Gabriella Marchi (23 July 1956 – 22 January 1990) was an Italian gymnast. She competed at the 1972 Summer Olympics.

References

External links
 

1956 births
1990 deaths
Italian female artistic gymnasts
Olympic gymnasts of Italy
Gymnasts at the 1972 Summer Olympics
Sportspeople from Rimini